Général Hippolyte-Albert Cambriels (11 August 1816 – 21 December 1891) was a French military commander.

Born in Lagrasse, Aude, he was the son  of Brigadier General Pierre Cambriels (1767–1845). He was educated at École spéciale militaire de Saint-Cyr. During the Franco-Prussian War, he was seriously injured at the Battle of Sedan in 1870.

He was created a Chevalier of the Legion of Honour in 1850, followed by upgrades to Officier (1856), Commandeur (1859), Grand Officier (1872), and finally Grand-Croix (1880).

He died at the Château de Boaça in Pyrénées-Orientales in 1891 and was buried at Père Lachaise Cemetery in Paris.

References

External links 

1816 births
1891 deaths
People from Aude
École Spéciale Militaire de Saint-Cyr alumni
French generals
Grand Croix of the Légion d'honneur
French military personnel of the Franco-Prussian War
Burials at Père Lachaise Cemetery